Rooting for You may refer to:

 "Rooting for You" (London Grammar song), 2017
 "Rooting for You" (Alessia Cara song), 2019